Ergotimos (Έργότιμος) was a Greek potter, active in Athens, circa 570–560 BC. His son Eucharios was also a potter, as was a grandson whose name is not known. 
The following works signed by him are known:
 Berlin, Antikensammlung  3151: footless cup
 Berlin, Antikensammlung V. I. 4604: 'Gordion cup', from Gordion
 Delphi: Fragment of a skyphos or kantharos
 Florence, Museo Archeologico Etrusco 4209: volute krater, so-called 'François vase'
 London, British Museum and Cambridge, Fitzwilliam Museum: Fragments of two cups from Naukratis
 New York, Metropolitan Museum 31.11.4: Stand
Apart from the cup Berlin 3151, all are painted by the vase painter Klitias.

See also
Black-figure pottery
Pottery of ancient Greece

Bibliography 
 John Beazley: Attic Black-Figure Vase-Painters, Oxford 1956, p. 76-80.
 Der neue Pauly IV, 1998, Col. 65 s.v. Ergotimos (Heide Mommsen)
 Künstlerlexikon der Antike I, München, Leipzig 2001, p. 214 s.v. Ergotimos (Bettina Kreuzer)

External links 

Ergotimos in Perseus

Ancient Greek potters
6th-century BC Athenians